Pocahontas: An Original Walt Disney Records Soundtrack is the soundtrack album to the 1995 Disney animated film, Pocahontas. It was released by Walt Disney Records on May 30, 1995, on CD and audio cassette. The soundtrack contains songs from the film, including each instrumental song, written by Alan Menken and Stephen Schwartz, and conducted by David Friedman. The main songs feature vocals by Judy Kuhn, Mel Gibson, Linda Hunt, Jim Cummings, David Ogden Stiers, and Bobbi Page. The soundtrack features two hit singles; "Colors of the Wind" performed by recording artist and actress Vanessa Williams, and the film's love theme song "If I Never Knew You" performed by recording artists Jon Secada and Shanice. The film won the Academy Award for Best Original Score and Best Original Song (for "Colors of the Wind").

In honor of the film's twentieth anniversary, the soundtrack was remastered and reissued as the eleventh entry of The Legacy Collection series. The Legacy edition includes the film's complete original soundtrack in chronological order, along with six demo recordings in a two-disc set. There are 28 tracks on disc one, and 14 tracks on disc two. This release includes the song "If I Never Knew You", performed by Kuhn and Gibson in the film. The original song performed by the characters was cut from the film, and not included on the original soundtrack. The song was put back into the movie when it was re-released for the 10th anniversary of the film, and finally featured on the new edition of the soundtrack.

Background 
The music for Pocahontas has one of the largest and most complex scores ever written for a Disney animated film. It was the fourth Disney animated film that was composed by Alan Menken. He had previously worked with lyricist Howard Ashman, who died before the making of Pocahontas. He began working with Stephen Schwartz, who became the lyricist for the soundtrack.

Schwartz was recommended to Menken by people at Disney. On a documentary of the soundtrack, Menken says that after he thought about it he realized that Schwartz' style would be perfect for the film's music because of his writing that is a brilliant combination of theater, folk, and classic. Menken said, "I just really felt that he and I would be able to find a voice that was unique to the two of us together, and we did." The first song they wrote together was "Colors of the Wind". According to Jim Pentecost, the producer of the film, the emotion of the lyrics and music for "Colors of the Wind" was very powerful and defined the movie and what it was going to be about. The song was written at the beginning stages of developing the story. Jim Pentecost said, "When Stephen came up with the title 'Colors of the Wind' and developed his lyric, it helped greatly to tell us what this movie should be."

Menken and Schwartz came together and were able to create this soundtrack based on things they felt strongly about and found a way of expressing through music. On the soundtrack documentary video, Schwartz talked about how they knew what they wanted to say through the music and portray who Pocahontas was, and they were able to find the parts of themselves that met with the character of Pocahontas to create the music for the film.

Track listing

Chart and commercial success 
The film's soundtrack is probably best known for the song that serves as the film's anthem, "Colors of the Wind", which went on to win an Academy Award, a Golden Globe Award, and a Grammy Award. As a single, "Colors of the Wind" went on to reach #4 on the U.S. pop charts in 1995, and was one of Williams' biggest hits. The Pocahontas soundtrack joined other Disney animated feature soundtrack albums in the multi-platinum category in the certifications from the Recording Industry Association of America. Pocahontas was simultaneously certified triple-platinum, platinum and gold. It became the fifth consecutive soundtrack for a Disney animated film to surpass the 3 million milestone, following The Little Mermaid, Beauty and the Beast, Aladdin, and The Lion King.

The soundtrack also won the Academy Award for Best Musical or Comedy Score, sold 2.3 million copies in the remaining two months of 1995 alone, and went on to reach No. 1 on the Billboard 200.

Charts

Weekly charts

Year-end charts

Singles

Certifications and sales

References

1995 soundtrack albums
1990s film soundtrack albums
Disney Renaissance soundtracks
Albums produced by Stephen Schwartz (composer)
Disney animation soundtracks
Soundtrack
Albums produced by Alan Menken
Walt Disney Records soundtracks
Alan Menken soundtracks
Scores that won the Best Original Score Academy Award